Karl Theodor Anton Maria von Dalberg (8 February 1744 – 10 February 1817) was Prince-Archbishop of Regensburg, Arch-Chancellor of the Holy Roman Empire, Bishop of Constance and Worms, Prince-Primate of the Confederation of the Rhine and Grand Duke of Frankfurt.

Early life and career

Born in Herrnsheim near Worms, Germany, as a member of Dalberg family, he was the son of Franz Heinrich von Dalberg (1716–1776), administrator of Worms, one of the chief counsellors of the Prince-elector and Archbishop of Mainz and his wife Baroness Maria Sophie Anna von Eltz-Kempenich (1722–1763). Karl devoted himself to the study of canon law, and entered the church. Having been appointed in 1772 governor of Erfurt, he won further advancement by his successful administration. In 1787 he was elected coadjutor cum iure successionis of the Archbishopric of Mainz and the Bishopric of Worms, and in 1788 of the Bishopric of Constance; at the same time, he became titular archbishop of Tarsus in Cilicia and was ordained priest (11/11/1787) and bishop (8/31/1788). While he did succeed the respective bishops in Constance (1800) and Worms (1802), he failed to succeed in Mainz as bishop, though he did succeed in Mainz's temporal rights and also, de facto, in the pastoral ones as far as the right bank of the Rhine was concerned.

As statesman, Dalberg was distinguished by his patriotic attitude, whether in ecclesiastical matters, in which he leaned to the Febronian view of a German national church, or in his efforts to galvanize the atrophied machinery of the Empire into some sort of effective central government of Germany. Failing in this, he turned to the rising star of Napoleon, believing that he had found in him the only force strong enough to save Germany from dissolution.

By the Treaty of Lunéville in 1801, in which all territories on the left bank of the river Rhine were ceded to France, Dalberg's predecessor had to surrender Mainz and Worms; the Concordat of 1801 had reduced Mainz to a simple diocese in the province of Mechelen that conscribed the French department of Donnersberg (including the city of Worms). For Mainz, Joseph Ludwig Colmar was soon appointed as bishop. (Worms, though it had lost its city, remained an extant diocese on the right bank of the Rhine, so Dalberg could succeed there.)

(Regensburg was also where the Imperial Deputation had taken place.) In addition, he was designated Archbishop of the (former Salzburg suffragan) Regensburg, to which (spiritually now) the former Mainz lands on the right bank of the Rhine, and the former Mainzian suffragans were attached.

This was, of course, the decision of a state authority which, in its spiritual part, could not take effect until ratified by the Pope; in any case, Regensburg's bishop, Schroffenberg, was still alive at the time. So, Dalberg did not exercise spiritual authority in the older part of the Regensburg diocese until Bishop Schroffenberg died, at which point he made himself elected vicar capitular of the diocese; finally, on February 1, 1805, he received the papal assent and was Archbishop of Regensburg.

Prince-Primate of the Confederation of the Rhine

After the dissolution of the Holy Roman Empire in 1806, Dalberg together with other princes joined the Confederation of the Rhine. He formally resigned the office of Arch-Chancellor in a letter to Emperor Francis II, and was appointed prince-primate of the Confederation of the Rhine by Napoleon. Not long after, Dalberg appointed Napoleon's uncle, Cardinal Fesch, coadjutor in his archdiocese (an action for which he had no canonical rights).

After the Treaty of Schönbrunn (1810), he was elevated by the French to the rank of Grand Duke of Frankfurt. This greatly augmented Dalberg's territories, although he had to cede Regensburg to the Kingdom of Bavaria. As Grand Duke of Frankfurt he ordered all restrictions on the Jews of Frankfurt lifted. This was opposed by the Lutheran town council, until 1811, when Dalberg issued a proclamation ending the requirement that Jews live in the ghetto or pay special taxes.

In 1813 he ceded all his temporal offices to Napoleon's stepson Eugène de Beauharnais, who had been heir apparent since 1810.

Death and legacy
Dalberg died in 1817 in Regensburg.

Though his political subservience to Napoleon was resented by a later generation in Germany, as a man and prelate he is remembered as amiable, conscientious and large-hearted. Himself a scholar and author, Dalberg was a notable patron of letters, and was the friend of Goethe, Schiller and Wieland.

Notes

External links

 

 

1744 births
1817 deaths
Roman Catholic bishops of Worms
19th-century Roman Catholic archbishops in the Holy Roman Empire
Archbishop-Electors of Mainz
Roman Catholic bishops of Constance
19th-century Roman Catholic bishops in Bavaria
Members of the Académie des Inscriptions et Belles-Lettres
Prince-primate of the Confederation of the Rhine
German Freemasons
Roman Catholic Freemasons